The Old Frostproof High School (also known as the Frostproof City Hall) is a historic school in Frostproof, Florida. It is located at 111 West 1st Street. On November 13, 1997, it was added to the U.S. National Register of Historic Places.

References

External links

 Polk County listings at National Register of Historic Places
 Frostproof City Hall at Florida's Office of Cultural and Historical Programs

National Register of Historic Places in Polk County, Florida
High schools in Polk County, Florida
Public high schools in Florida